Cryptocarya foveolata, known as the mountain walnut is a rainforest tree growing at high altitude in eastern Australia. Despite the common name, it belongs to the laurel family.

Fallen leaves from this tree may be identified by the two glands at the base of the leaf, and by the compact leaf shape and venation.

The group of Cryptocarya trees are mostly from the tropics or warmer temperate areas. This tree is unusual as it grows in cooler regions, subject to frost and occasional snow. It's also an unusually tall tree for the genus Cryptocarya.

Cryptocarya foveolata grows in rainforests on fertile soils. Mostly growing above 600 metres above sea level. Often seen in association with the Antarctic Beech. The natural range of distribution is from Mount Royal in the Barrington Tops to the McPherson Range on the border of Queensland and New South Wales.

Description 

Cryptocarya foveolata is a small to large tree, occasionally reaching 45 metres in height and with a trunk diameter of 120 cm. The bark is brown, mostly smooth with lines of vertical bumps running up the trunk. The base of the tree is not particularly buttressed.

Leaves alternate, ovate or elliptical with a prominent tip. Three veined with an easily seen mid vein, raised on the upper and lower side of the leaf. One or two pairs of hollow glands (foveolae) forming at the base of the leaf. One on either side of the midrib. Leaves 4 to 7 cm long.

Small, cream, flowers form on panicles from December to February. Fruit ripens from October to January. Being a fleshy black drupe, 12 to 15 mm across, with a single seed inside, around 10 mm in diameter. Like most Australian Cryptocarya fruit, removal of the aril is advised to assist seed germination. Around a third of the seeds will germinate.

.

References

External links

Trees of Australia
Flora of New South Wales
Flora of Queensland
Laurales of Australia
foveolata
Trees of mild maritime climate